The Detroit Eight Mile Wall, also referred to as Detroit's Wailing Wall, Berlin Wall or The Birwood Wall, is a ,  separation wall that stretches about  in length. 1 foot (0.30 m) is buried in the ground and the remaining 5 feet (1.5 m) is visible to the community. It was constructed in 1941 to physically separate black and white homeowners on the sole basis of race. The wall no longer serves to racially segregate homeowners and, as of 1971, both sides of the barrier have been predominantly black.

The wall begins across the street from the northern boundary of Van Antwerp Park, on Pembroke Avenue between Birwood and Mendota streets. It extends north until just south of 8 Mile Road. An exposed stretch of the wall with no homes to the east runs through Alfonso Wells Memorial Playground, between Chippewa Avenue and Norfolk Street. Community activists and Detroit residents collaborated in 2006 to turn this portion of the wall into a mural. Paintings have depicted, for example, neighborhood children blowing bubbles, a group of a cappella singers, Rosa Parks's boarding the bus signifying her contribution to the Civil Rights Movement, and citizens protesting for equitable housing policy.

Background

The World War I industrial economy of Detroit afforded opportunities for women and black men to become more active participants in the labor force of the city. A large percentage of white men were drafted to fight in the war, leaving many of their jobs vacant and needing to be filled. This allowed black citizens to fill empty job positions, causing a large demographic shift in the makeup of the Detroit workforce. In light of more job opportunities, the city experienced an increase in the population of black people seeking economic and social mobility. But as white men were returning from war and more black citizens entered the city, competition for scarce housing increased tensions between the two groups. White residents took over most private-sector housing, pushing black residents to less desirable areas of the city. The Great Depression furthered the scarcity of housing as the population continued to soar.

The New Deal legislation implemented under President Franklin Delano Roosevelt intended to make private housing more accessible to citizens. The Home Owners Loan Corporation (HOLC) was created in 1933, followed by the Federal Housing Administration (FHA). In short, these programs reduced barriers to housing by offering discounted payment plans spread out over 20-30 years. These policies significantly improved home-ownership accessibility for working-class white Detroit residents and promoted single-family units. Yet according to Thomas J. Sugrue, a Detroit scholar and historian, black residents did not benefit from the New Deal era of legislation because "local governments had the final say over the expenditure over the federal funds, the location of projects, and the type constructed." As a result of local government bodies being composed of white politicians, white residents received federal funding, while black residents were left to seek housing with no aid. 

The primary concern of white Detroit residents was maintaining racial homogeneity. Local policies allowed for the prevention of black "infiltration" into white neighborhoods due in part to the HOLC members serving as federal appraisers. They identified areas that were "safe" for banks to issue loans to by giving each neighborhood a rating: A, B, C, or D. An "A," or "green," was practically guaranteed a loan, largely due to the fact that these areas were homogeneously white and affluent. In turn, a "D," or "red," neighborhood was occupied by black residents who were systematically prevented from receiving a loan. This became a phenomenon across the United States known as red-lining. In Detroit specifically, red-lining preserved racial homogeneity and increased racial tensions. For example, if a black family moved into a white neighborhood, the rating of the neighborhood would change and everyone’s property value would decrease, creating resentment among the two communities. Between 1930 and 1950, three out of five homes purchased in the United States were financed by FHA, yet less than two percent of the FHA loans were made to non-white home buyers.

Without any financial aid, black neighborhoods became starkly different than white neighborhoods. Renovations, purchasing homes, and rent in these areas were far too expensive to afford, causing deterioration in these areas and overall lower living standards. The appearance of black neighborhoods solidified white resident's opinions that Black residents were a detriment to any neighborhood. Thomas J. Sugrue wrote, “the decaying neighborhoods offered seemingly convincing evidence to white homeowners that blacks were feckless and irresponsible and fueled white fears that blacks would ruin any neighborhood that they moved into.” 

Additionally, the New Deal was perceived differently by the federal and local level. In Detroit, these policies caused debates between public housing and private home-ownership, two commodities that those living in Detroit believed could not work together. These debates were often racial, with public housing aimed to help black people in the city and private home-ownership aimed at helping middle class white people become homeowners. The debate over public housing was centered around the belief that such an idea would threaten the private sector. Affordable living for the lower class, usually minorities, meant interference with a successful, free market real estate. Community groups determined to keep their neighborhoods segregated lobbied against public housing projects, and contractors found business working in private housing.

The Eight Mile/Wyoming neighborhood, where this wall is located, was one of many that was significantly affected by the housing crisis. This neighborhood is located outside the city and was described as a farmland where residents pooled resources in order to build their own homes. The houses were small, but the residents were proud of their homes they built up from nothing. In 1938, the Detroit Housing Commission conducted a survey and found residents living here to be among the poorest in Detroit. Despite this, the residents of this neighborhood were both independent and secure with over 90% of residents living in these single family built homes.

Eight Mile community and construction
Due to redlining, the Eight Mile area was extremely poor and was considered a "blighted area". After World War II, a developer saw the area as a new spot to construct an all-white subdivision. HOLC appraisers viewed this as high-risk because of how close it was to the neighborhood occupied by black people. FHA, as a result, was unable and unwilling to lend out loans for home construction. Sugrue reports, "the developer worked out a compromise with the FHA, garnering loans and mortgage guarantees in exchange for the construction of a foot-thick, six-foot-high wall, running for a half-mile on the property line separating the black and white neighborhoods."

Contractors and realtors were able to attract whites to this area because the wall would "protect them". It served to keep property values high and to keep the neighborhoods racially segregated. It became known as the Detroit Eight Mile Wall, the "Detroit Wailing Wall", and the Birwood Wall.

Wall today 
The wall still stands in the Eight Mile area to this day. The Wall’s function has transformed from being a racial barrier to a backyard fence and mural for the current residents of this community. The residents are aware that the Wall was originally meant to be racially divisive, but now black people live on both sides of it. In 2006, a portion of the Wall was converted into a mural by Detroit residents and community activists. It serves as a reminder and recognition of history, but also of a hopeful, more colorful future.

In 2021, the wall was listed on the National Register of Historic Places, as part of the Civil Rights Movement and the African American Experience in 20th Century Detroit Multiple Property Submission.

References

National Register of Historic Places in Detroit
African-American segregation in the United States
Buildings and structures in Detroit
Separation barriers
Urban politics in the United States
African-American history in Detroit
1941 in Detroit
1941 establishments in Michigan
African-American-related controversies